St. Thomas School, Honnavar (established in 1905) is one of the oldest high schools in the Uttar Kannada district of India.

Headmasters
 Mr. Munch, a German
 Rev. Lutz
 Mr. P.N. Menon
 Mr. M P Jacob
 Mr. Oommen
 Mr. J. Abraham
 Mr. J. Daniel
 Mrs. chinnamma Thomas
 Mr. Kalbag
 Mr. T. S. Shastry
 Father Alexander Thomas
 Mr. S. J. Kairanna
 Soloman Y. Bailur (current)

References
   St. Thomas High School, Honnavar

External links
Official Website

High schools and secondary schools in Karnataka
Schools in Uttara Kannada district
Educational institutions established in 1905
1905 establishments in India